Sanjiv Gooljar (born 30 March 1982) is a Trinidadian cricketer. He played in two first-class and five List A matches for Trinidad and Tobago from 2005 to 2007.

See also
 List of Trinidadian representative cricketers

References

External links
 

1982 births
Living people
Trinidad and Tobago cricketers